This article details the qualifying phase for Table tennis at the 2016 Summer Paralympics.  The competition at these Games will comprise a total of 276 athletes coming from their respective NPCs. 31 (20 male, 11 female) will be selected by the Bipartite Commission. A further 55 male and 50 female quota places were reserved for continental competition.

The remaining 99 male and 41 female players earn places for the Games through the world ranking list prepared by ITTF that concluded on December 31, 2015.

Men  

The following achieved the necessary ranking by the final date, and have been invited to the Rio 2016 Games.

Class 1

 3 untaken regional places transferred to the ranking list.

Class 2

 2 untaken regional places transferred to the ranking list.

References

2016 in table tennis